Cervical lymph nodes are lymph nodes found in the neck. Of the 800 lymph nodes in the human body, 300 are in the neck. Cervical lymph nodes are subject to a number of different pathological conditions including tumours, infection and inflammation.

Classification 

There are approximately 300 lymph nodes in the neck, and they can be classified in a number of different ways.

History 

The classification of the cervical lymph nodes is generally attributed to Henri Rouvière in his 1932 publication "Anatomie des Lymphatiques de l'Homme"  Rouviere described the cervical lymph nodes as a collar which surrounded the upper aerodigestive tract, consisting of submental, facial, submandibular, parotid, mastoid, occipital and retropharyngeal nodes, together with two chains that run in the long axis of the neck, the anterior cervical and postero-lateral cervical groups.

However, this system was based upon anatomical landmarks found in dissection, making it imperfectly suited to the needs of clinicians, which led to new terminology for the lymph nodes that could be palpated. The most commonly used system is one based on a classification of the lymph nodes into numbered groupings, devised at the Memorial Sloan Kettering Cancer Center in the 1930s. This has been variously modified since. In 1991, the American Academy of Otolaryngology published a standardised version of thisto provide a uniform approach to neck dissection that was updated in 2002, including the addition of sub-levels, e.g. IIA and IIB.

Modern systems 

More recently, classification systems have been proposed organized around what can be observed via diagnostic imaging. In addition to the American Academy of Otolaryngology, systems have been devised by the American Joint Committee on Cancer (AJCC). The AJCC system from the 7th edition of the Staging Manual (2009) remains unchanged in the 8th edition of 2018.

Lymph node levels
The American Academy of Otolaryngology system (2002) divides the nodes as follows:
 Level I: Submental and submandibular nodes
 Level Ia: Submental - within the triangular boundary of the anterior belly digastric muscles and the hyoid bone.
 Level Ib: Submandibular triangle - within the boundaries of the anterior belly of the digastric muscle, the stylohyoid muscle and the body of the mandible.
 Level II: Upper jugular nodes (Subdigastric nodes) - around the upper third of the internal jugular vein and adjacent accessory nerve. The upper boundary is the base of the skull and the lower boundary is the inferior border of the hyoid bone. The anterior/medial boundary is the stylohyoid muscle and the posterior/lateral one is the posterior border of the sternocleidomastoid muscle. On imaging the anterior/medial boundary is the vertical plane  of the posterior surface of the submandibular gland.
 Level IIa: Anterio-medial to the vertical plane of the accessory nerve.
 Level IIb: Postero-lateral to this plane.
 Level III: Middle jugular nodes - around the middle third of the internal jugular vein, from the inferior border of the hyoid to the inferior border of the cricoid cartilage. Antero-medially they are bounded by the lateral border of the sternohyoid muscle and postero-laterally by the posterior border of the sternocleidomastoid.
 Level IV: Lower jugular nodes - around the lower third of the internal jugular vein from the inferior border of the cricoid to the clavicle, anteromedially by the lateral border of the sternohyoid and posterolaterally by the posterior border of the sternocleidomastoid.
 Level V: Posterior triangle nodes - around the lower half of the spinal accessory nerve and the transverse cervical artery, and includes the supraclavicular nodes. The upper boundary is the apex formed by the convergence of the sternocleidomastoid and trapezius muscles, and inferiorly by the clavicle. The anteromedial border is the posterior border of the sternocleidomastoid and the posterolateral border is the anterior border of the trapezius.
 Level VA: Above the horizontal plane formed by the inferior border of the anterior cricoid arch, including the spinal accessory nodes.
 Level VB: Lymph nodes below this plane, including the transverse cervical nodes and supraclavicular nodes (except Virchow's node which is in IV).
 Level VI: Anterior compartment nodes - Pretracheal, paratracheal, precricoid (Delphian) and perithyroid nodes, including those on the recurrent laryngeal nerve. The upper border is the hyoid, the lower the suprasternal notch, and the lateral borders the common carotid arteries.

The American Joint Committee on Cancer (AJCC) system differs from the above by including Level VII, but the American Academy considered these to be anatomically mediastinal rather than cervical nodes, and therefore should not be included in the classification of neck nodes. However it is based on the 2002 American Academy system, although the boundaries are defined slightly differently.

The boundaries are defined as (Superior, Inferior, Antero-medial, Postero-lateral)
 Level IA: Symphysis of mandible, Body of hyoid, Anterior belly of contralateral digastric muscle, Anterior belly of ipsilateral digastric muscle
 Level IB: Body of mandible, Posterior belly of digastric muscle, Anterior belly of digastric muscle, Stylohyoid muscle
 Level IIA: Skull base, Horizontal plane defined by the inferior border of the hyoid bone, The stylohyoid muscle, Vertical plane defined by the spinal accessory nerve
 Level IIB: Skull base, Horizontal plane defined by the inferior body of the hyoid bone, Vertical plane defined by the spinal accessory nerve, Lateral border of the sternocleidomastoid muscle
 Level III: Horizontal plane defined by the inferior body of hyoid, Horizontal plane defined by the inferior border of the cricoid cartilage, Lateral border of the sternohyoid muscle, Lateral border of the sternocleidomastoid or sensory branches of cervical plexus
 Level IV: Horizontal plane defined by the inferior border of the cricoid cartilage, Clavicle, Lateral border of the sternohyoid muscle, Lateral border of the sternocleidomastoid or sensory branches of cervical plexus
 Level VA: Apex of the convergence of the sternocleidomastoid and trapezius muscles, Horizontal plane defined by the lower border of the cricoid cartilage, Posterior border of the sternocleidomastoid muscle or sensory branches of cervical plexus, Anterior border of the trapezius muscle
 Level VB: Horizontal plane defined by the lower border of the cricoid cartilage, Clavicle, Posterior border of the sternocleidomastoid muscle, Anterior border of the trapezius muscle
 Level VI: Hyoid bone, Suprasternal notch, Common carotid artery, Common carotid artery
 Level VII: Suprasternal notch, Innominate artery, Sternum, Trachea, esophagus, and prevertebral fascia

While an imaging based system was proposed in 1999, these concepts were integrated into the 2002 revision of the American Academy system. In addition to needing a standardised approach to classification of lymph nodes for the purposes of neck dissection, the application of radiation therapy also requires such an approach and has resulted in an international consensus guideline (2013).

Clinical significance

Infectious mononucleosis (glandular fever) affects the cervical lymph nodes which become swollen. The characterization of cancerous lymph nodes on CT scan, MRI or ultrasound is difficult, and usually requires confirmation by other nuclear imaging techniques such as PET scans. Tissue diagnosis by fine needle aspiration (which has a high rate of accuracy), may also be required. Involvement of the cervical lymph nodes with metastatic cancer is the single most important prognostic factor in head and neck squamous cell carcinoma and may be associated with a halving of survival. Where the cancer has penetrated the capsule of the lymph gland (extracapsular extension) survival may be decreased by a further 50%. Other important factors are the level, the number of nodes and their size, which are also correlated with the risk of distant metastases. Cervical lymph node metastasis is also a common feature of papillary thyroid carcinoma.

Additional images

References

Bibliography 

 
 
 
 Slides

External links
 
 
 

Lymphatics of the head and neck